There are several Christian Churches with a Diocese or Eparchy of Saskatoon, all with see in Saskatoon, Saskatchewan, Canada :

 Anglican Diocese of Saskatoon of the Anglican Church of Canada
 Roman Catholic Diocese of Saskatoon of the Roman Catholic Church
 Ukrainian Catholic Eparchy of Saskatoon of the Ukrainian Greek Catholic Church